Austin Tyler Reaves (born May 29, 1998), nicknamed “Hillbilly Kobe”, is an American professional basketball player for the Los Angeles Lakers of the National Basketball Association (NBA). He played college basketball for the Wichita State Shockers and the Oklahoma Sooners.

High school career
Reaves attended Cedar Ridge High School in Newark, Arkansas. He won back-to-back Class 2A state titles in his first two years. Reaves scored 73 points in a triple-overtime win over Forrest City High School. As a senior, he averaged 32.5 points, 8.8 rebounds and 5.1 assists per game, leading his team to a Class 3A state title. Reaves was named MVP of the state tournament after averaging 43.3 points through four games. He was a two-time Class 3A All-State selection. On January 20, 2016, he committed to playing college basketball for Wichita State over offers from South Dakota State and Arkansas State.

College career

Wichita State
Entering his freshman season at Wichita State, Reaves underwent surgery to repair a torn labrum in his left shoulder. He had been playing through the injury since his junior year of high school. As a freshman, he averaged 4.1 points per game in a reserve role. After the season, Reaves underwent surgery to repair a torn labrum in his right shoulder, which had dislocated three times during his college career, causing him to miss games. On January 28, 2018, he posted a sophomore season-high 23 points and four assists in a 90–71 win over Tulsa. Reaves made seven three-pointers in the first half, the most in a half in program history. As a sophomore, he averaged 8.1 points and 3.1 rebounds per game, shooting 42.5 percent from three-point range.

Oklahoma
After his sophomore season, Reaves transferred to Oklahoma and sat out the following season due to NCAA transfer rules. During his redshirt year, he weight trained and gained 20 lbs (9.1 kg). On March 7, 2020, Reaves recorded a career-high 41 points, six assists and five rebounds in a 78–76 win over TCU. He led a 19-point second-half comeback and made the game-winning shot with 0.5 seconds remaining. As a redshirt junior, Reaves averaged 14.7 points, 5.3 rebounds and three assists per game and was named to the Big 12 All-Newcomer Team. On December 6, he posted a senior season-high 32 points, nine assists and six rebounds in an 82–78 win against TCU. In the second round of the NCAA tournament, Reaves scored 27 points in an 87–71 loss to top-seeded Gonzaga. As a senior, he averaged 18.4 points, 5.5 rebounds and 4.6 assists per game, earning First Team All-Big 12 honors. On March 31, Reaves declared for the 2021 NBA draft, forgoing his remaining college eligibility.

Professional career

Los Angeles Lakers (2021–present) 
After going undrafted in the 2021 NBA draft, Reaves signed a two-way contract with the Los Angeles Lakers on August 3, 2021. On September 27, he was signed to a standard NBA contract. On October 22, Reaves made his NBA debut, scoring eight points off the bench in a 115–105 loss to the Phoenix Suns. On December 15, he scored 15 points, on 5-of-6 shooting from three, grabbed 7 rebounds, and hit a game-winning 3-pointer in a 107–104 victory over the Dallas Mavericks.

During the Lakers' season finale on April 10, 2022, in a 146–141 overtime win over the Denver Nuggets, Reaves notched the first triple-double of his career, and put up career highs in points, rebounds, and assists, with 31 points, 16 rebounds, and 10 assists in 42 minutes.

On March 19, 2023, Reaves scored a career-high 35 points with six rebounds and six assists off the bench in a 111–105 win against the Orlando Magic. He scored the final 10 points for the Lakers to propel them back into the tenth seed of the playoffs.

Career statistics

College

|-
| style="text-align:left;"| 2016–17
| style="text-align:left;"| Wichita State
| 33 || 0 || 11.8 || .448 || .509 || .757 || 1.8 || 1.1 || .4 || .3 || 4.1
|-
| style="text-align:left;"| 2017–18
| style="text-align:left;"| Wichita State
| 33 || 11 || 21.5 || .450 || .425 || .827 || 3.1 || 2.0 || .5 || .2 || 8.1
|-
| style="text-align:left;"| 2018–19
| style="text-align:left;"| Oklahoma
| style="text-align:center;" colspan="11"|  Redshirt
|-
| style="text-align:left;"| 2019–20
| style="text-align:left;"| Oklahoma
| 31 || 31 || 33.2 || .381 || .259 || .848 || 5.3 || 3.0 || 1.0 || .3 || 14.7
|-
| style="text-align:left;"| 2020–21
| style="text-align:left;"| Oklahoma
| 25 || 25 || 34.5 || .443 || .305 || .865 || 5.5 || 4.6 || .9 || .3 || 18.3
|- class="sortbottom"
| style="text-align:center;" colspan="2"| Career
| 122 || 67 || 24.5 || .421 || .347 || .844 || 3.8 || 2.6 || .7 || .3 || 10.8

NBA

|-
| style="text-align:left;"| 
| style="text-align:left;"| L.A. Lakers
| 61 || 19 || 23.2 || .459 || .317 || .839 || 3.2 || 1.8 || .5 || .3 || 7.3 ||
|-
| style="text-align:left;"| 
| style="text-align:left;"| L.A. Lakers
| 47 || 12 || 27.5 || .506 || .391 || .875 || 2.9 || 2.5 || .6 || .4 || 12.0
|-
|- class="sortbottom"
| style="text-align:center;" colspan="2"| Career
| 108 || 31 || 25.1 || .483 || .353 || .859 || 3.0 || 2.1 || .5 || .3 || 8.9

Personal life
Reaves grew up a Los Angeles Lakers fan.

Reaves is the son of Nicole Wilkett and Brian Reaves. Both of his parents played college basketball for Arkansas State. His mother averaged 21.3 points per game and earned all-conference honors as a senior, while his father tied for third in program history with 384 career assists. Reaves' brother, Spencer, played college basketball for North Greenville and Central Missouri before embarking on a professional career. Reaves credits his brother for sparking his interest in basketball.

References

External links
Oklahoma Sooners bio
Wichita State Shockers bio

1998 births
Living people
American men's basketball players
German men's basketball players
Basketball players from Arkansas
Los Angeles Lakers players
Oklahoma Sooners men's basketball players
People from Independence County, Arkansas
Shooting guards
Wichita State Shockers men's basketball players
Undrafted National Basketball Association players